The Funeral is a 1996 American crime-drama film directed by Abel Ferrara and starring Christopher Walken, Chris Penn, Annabella Sciorra, Isabella Rossellini, Vincent Gallo, Benicio del Toro and Gretchen Mol.

The story concerns the funeral of one of three brothers in a family of gangsters that lived in New York City in 1930s. It details the past of the brothers and their families through a series of flashbacks.

Chris Penn won the Volpi Cup for Best Supporting Actor at the 1996 Venice Film Festival for his performance. The film received five Independent Spirit Awards nominations including Best Film, Best Director, Best Actor, Best Screenplay and Best Cinematography.

Plot

The film begins with the funeral of one of the three Tempio brothers, a set of violent criminals. Mourning the passage of their beloved brother Johnny are Chez and Ray. Ray is cold and calculating, while Chez is hot tempered. Flashbacks show us that Johnny was more sensitive. Exposure to communist meetings as a spy sway Johnny's opinions. The chief suspect in Johnny's murder is rival gangster Gaspare Spoglia.

Ray and Chez swear revenge. Ray's wife, Jeanette, opposes the campaign of retribution and the violence it will bring, while Chez' wife, Clara, struggles to deal with her husband's obsessive nature.

Ray has Gaspare abducted for interrogation and they go to see Johnny's body. He is satisfied by Gaspare's claim of innocence, in part because he says that gangsters are superstitious, believing that the wounds of the corpse will start bleeding in the presence of the killer. Therefore the killer will not willingly enter the dead victim's presence. Gaspare is comfortable to be in the presence of the victim, so is not the killer. Ray releases Gaspare but instructs his men to murder him later.

As it turns out, Johnny was not murdered by rival gangsters, but by a man who claimed Johnny had raped his girlfriend. Ray's men identify him by tracking the car he had driven to commit the crime. Pressed by Ray, the killer confesses that he had wanted revenge because Johnny had beaten him up in front of his girlfriend and friends. Ray kills him.

As he buries the dead murderer, Chez reflects on his brothers' lives before the tragedy. He then returns to Ray's house and shoots and kills Ray and his two bodyguards. Chez then shoots Johnny, lying dead in the casket, before putting the gun in his own mouth and committing suicide as the family women wail over Ray's dying body.

Cast
 Christopher Walken as Raimondo "Ray" Tempio
 Chris Penn as Cesarino "Chez" Tempio
 Annabella Sciorra as Jean
 Isabella Rossellini as Clara Tempio
 Vincent Gallo as Giovanni "Johnny" Tempio
 Benicio del Toro as Gaspare Spoglia
 Gretchen Mol as Helen
 John Ventimiglia as Sali
 Paul Hipp as Ghouly
 David Patrick Kelly as Michael Stein
 Frank John Hughes as Bacco
 Victor Argo as Julius
 Robert Miano as Enrico
 Andrew Fiscella as Murder Witness
 Paul Perri as Young Ray

Reception
Reception from critics was positive, as The Funeral holds a 79% rating on Rotten Tomatoes based on 34 reviews.

Roger Ebert gave The Funeral three stars out of four, praising the acting especially.

Janet Maslin, writing in the New York Times, gave it a positive review, calling it 'hotblooded' and 'well-acted'.

Ken Tucker, writing in Entertainment Weekly gave the film a positive review, calling it 'fine, thoughtful, and jolting'.

A review in Empire gave the film four stars out of five, praising the 'complex characters' and 'impressive cast'.

References

External links

1996 films
American crime drama films
American films about revenge
1996 crime drama films
Films directed by Abel Ferrara
Films scored by Joe Delia
Films set in the 1930s
Films set in New York City
Films about the American Mafia
Murder–suicide in films
Fratricide in fiction
1990s English-language films
1990s American films